Said Husejinović (born 13 May 1988) is a Bosnian professional footballer who plays as an attacking midfielder for Bosnian Premier League club Sloboda Tuzla.

Club career

Werder Bremen
On 1 July 2008, it was announced that Werder Bremen and Sloboda Tuzla had come to an agreement over the transfer of Husejinović to Werder for €900,000. On 17 January 2009, Husejinović was loaned to 1. FC Kaiserslautern until the end of the season.

Sarajevo
On 26 July 2012, he scored two goals against Bulgarian side Levski Sofia in a UEFA Europa League match to help his team to a prestigious 3–1 win (the Bosnians advanced to the next round after an aggregate score of 3–2 and were subsequently eliminated by Montenegrin club FK Zeta.

Dinamo Zagreb
In late December 2012, he was close to signing a contract with CSKA Sofia, but instead joined Dinamo Zagreb in early January 2013.
He was injured in a game against RNK Split in October 2013. He was not able to play until May 2014. After the injury, he was loaned out to Lokomotiva Zagreb in 2015  and for a short period in 2016, played for the Dinamo Zagreb second team.

Sarajevo
After not enough playing time, Husejinović left Dinamo Zagreb and signed a contract with his former club Sarajevo. He left the club after 2 years in 2018.

Sloboda Tuzla
On 1 July 2018, Husejinović signed with Sloboda Tuzla. He left Sloboda on 15 June 2019 after his contract expired.

During his time in Sloboda, Husejinović was one of the best players of the club during the 2018–19 season, and was also one of the players with the most games played. He played in 29 league games and in 31  games in all competitions (including the league), scoring 3 goals in the process.

Tuzla City
On 17 June 2019, Husejinović signed a three-year contract with Tuzla City. He made his official debut for Tuzla City on 20 July 2019, in a 1–5 away league win against Zvijezda 09. Husejinović scored his first goal for Tuzla City also in a league match, this time in a 1–3 away win against Široki Brijeg on 15 September 2019.

On 11 December 2019, Tuzla City and Husejinović decided to part ways, mutually terminating his contract with the club.

Return to Sloboda Tuzla
In January 2020, for a second time in his career, Husejinović decided to come back to Sloboda Tuzla. He scored his first goal for Sloboda since his return on 12 August 2020, in a league match against Mladost Doboj Kakanj.

International career
Husejinović has played for the national U21 team. He made his senior debut for Bosnia and Herzegovina in a March 2008 friendly match against Macedonia and has earned a total of 2 caps, scoring no goals. His other international was an August 2008 friendly against Bulgaria.

Career statistics

Club

International

Honours
Werder Bremen 
DFB-Pokal: 2008–09

Dinamo Zagreb 
1. HNL: 2012–13, 2013–14, 2014–15, 2015–16
Croatian Cup: 2014–15, 2015–16
Croatian Super Cup: 2013

References

External links

1988 births
Living people
People from Zvornik
Association football midfielders
Bosnia and Herzegovina footballers
Bosnia and Herzegovina under-21 international footballers
Bosnia and Herzegovina international footballers
FK Sloboda Tuzla players
SV Werder Bremen players
1. FC Kaiserslautern players
FK Sarajevo players
GNK Dinamo Zagreb players
NK Lokomotiva Zagreb players
FK Tuzla City players
Premier League of Bosnia and Herzegovina players
Bundesliga players
2. Bundesliga players
Croatian Football League players
Bosnia and Herzegovina expatriate footballers
Expatriate footballers in Germany
Bosnia and Herzegovina expatriate sportspeople in Germany
Expatriate footballers in Croatia
Bosnia and Herzegovina expatriate sportspeople in Croatia